Major General Twan Mrat Naing, also spelled Tun Myat Naing (Arakanese:ထွန်းမြတ်နိုင်), is an Arakanese revolutionary and commander in chief of the Arakan Army, an ethnic armed organization. Twan Mrat Naing has led the Arakan Army since its founding in 2009, and maintains the rank of Major General. Twan Mrat Naing is of Arakanese descent and resides in Laiza, Kachin State, where the Arakan Army's "temporary headquarters" are.

Early life 
Naing was born in Akyab (now Sittwe), the state capital of Rakhine State, on 7 November 1978.

Career 
Naing previously worked as a tour guide in Yangon. In 1998, he planned to join National Unity Party of Arakan but their general was killed in action. After returning to Rakhine where he studied at Technological University, Sittwe.  

In 2004, he collaborated with Nyo Twan Awng (also known as Zaw Myo Thet), a surgeon doctor who is now a Vice Commander in-Chief of Arakan Army. In 2009, they founded the Arakan Army. While mining for jade in Kachin State, he recruited disaffected Arakanese Buddhists to his insurgent group. He was one of twenty-six men to form the Arakan Army with support from the Kachin Independence Army.

In June 2022, military spokespeople from the State Administration Council said that provocative rhetoric from Twan Mrat Naing as the leader of the Arakan Army was inviting conflict. The informal ceasefire between AA and the junta would breakdown after an junta airstike on an AA base in Kayin State.

Arrests by Myanmar government 
On 10 July 2019, Aung Mrat Kyaw, Twan Mrat Naing's younger brother, along with five Arakanese were detained by the Singaporean government and deported to Myanmar,  where they were arrested shortly after arriving. Singapore's home ministry said they had organized and mobilized some members of the Myanmar community in Singapore to support the Arakan Army, and its political wing, the United League of Arakan.

On 18 October 2019, the younger sister of Twan Mrat Naing, Moe Hnin Phyu and her husband, Kyaw Naing, were arrested at the Yangon International Airport after they returned from Chiang Mai, Thailand and are currently being questioned. They are accused of having the connection with the seizure of explosive devices in Mandalay according to Zaw Htay, Spokesperson of the State Counsellor's Office.

On 6 December 2019, Twan Mrat Naing's wife Hnin Zar Phyu and her two children were detained by Thai immigration officials in Chiang Mai, when she went there to extend her visa. Thailand Immigration Bureau's Chiang Mai office arrested her due to the presence of her name on the list who has affiliation with the Arakan Army, provided by the Myanmar Government. On 25 February 2020, the detained family left for Switzerland under the political asylum initiated by the UNHCR.

On 9 June 2021, Aung Myat Kyaw, Moe Hnin Phyu and her husband were released from prison after all charges against them were dropped. The release happened after the Tatmadaw took power by a coup d'état.

Personal life 
Twan Mrat Naing is married to Hnun Zar Phru (Hnin Zar Phyu in Burmese). The couple have two children, a daughter, Saw Prae Shun, and a son, Mrat Lurn Zan. Twan Mrat Naing's father-in-law is San Kyaw Hla, the speaker of the Rakhine State Hluttaw and an Arakan National Party (ANP) politician.

See also
 Arakan Army (Kachin State)
 Internal Conflict in Myanmar

References

External links 
 
 

Burmese people of Rakhine descent
Burmese military personnel
Living people
Burmese rebels
1978 births
Burmese warlords